Beibut Atamkulov (Beibıt Bäkırūly Atamqūlov; born 19 May 1964) is a Kazakh politician and diplomat currently serving as the Minister of Industry and Infrastructure Development. He served as a Minister of Foreign Affairs from December 2018 to September 2019. Atamkulov has an economic and financial background. Previously, Atamkulov served as the head of the newly created Ministry of Defence and Aerospace Industry of Kazakhstan.

Early life and education 
In 1986, Beibut Atamkulov graduated from the Satbayev University with a degree in Metallurgical Engineering. In 2000, he graduated from St. Petersburg State University of Economics and Finance, and holds the degree of Candidate of Economic Sciences.

From 1986 to 1991, he worked as a smelter, a shift foreman, a senior foreman, a leading engineer, and a deputy head of the department at the Chimkent Lead Plant.

Career 
Atamkulov has extensive career in international relations. From 2006 to 2007, he served as Counsellor and later Minister-Counselor of the Embassy of Kazakhstan in Russia (Moscow). In 2007–08, he served as Minister-Counsellor of the Embassy of the Kazakhstan in Iran (Tehran). In 2008–10, he served as Consul General of Kazakhstan in Frankfurt am Main in Germany. From 2010 to 2012, Atamkulov served as Ambassador Extraordinary and Plenipotentiary of Kazakhstan to Malaysia with concurrent accreditation to the Philippines, Indonesia and Brunei.

On 8 August 2015, he was appointed an akim of South Kazakhstan Region. He served that position until he became the Minister of Defense and Aerospace Industry on 7 October 2016.

On 26 December 2018, Atamkulov was appointed as the Minister of Foreign Affairs. He conducted his first visit to the United States as Foreign Minister under President Kassym-Jomart Tokayev on 1–2 July 2019. On the second day of the visit, he met with U.S. Secretary of State Mike Pompeo. The Secretary expressed strong support to strengthening bilateral relations and working with the newly elected Kazakh President.

Atamkulov participated in the 15th EU-Central Asia Ministerial Meeting in Kyrgyz capital Bishkek on 7 July 2019. The Conference was dedicated to the launch of the new EU strategy on Central Asia. On the sidelines of the event, Atamkulov presented the Order of Dostyk (Friendship) of the 1st degree to EU's High Representative for foreign policy Federica Mogherini on behalf of President Tokayev.

Atamkulov was released from the position of Foreign Minister and appointed as Minister of Industry and Infrastructure Development of Kazakhstan in September 2019.

On October 31, 2022, was appointed Ambassador Extraordinary and Plenipotentiary of the Republic of Kazakhstan to Republic of Uzbekistan.

See also 
Ministry of Foreign Affairs (Kazakhstan)

References 

Living people
1964 births
Foreign ministers of Kazakhstan